The 2015 IFAF World Championship was the fifth instance of the IFAF World Championship, an international American football tournament. The United States hosted the tournament. Seven teams had confirmed their participation for the tournament in Canton, Ohio.

The tournament was to be hosted by Stockholm, Sweden with all games to be taken place at the new Tele2 Arena, but on 19 December 2014, the local organizing committee for the Stockholm 2015 VM Amerikansk fotboll announced that it could not raise the sponsor structure to run the event and thus had to cancel. USA Football then stepped in and announced the Championships would be held at the Tom Benson Hall of Fame Stadium in Canton. Several days later both the German and Austrian teams announced they would not be able to attend the 2015 Championships citing the increased financial costs of travelling to the United States and also questioning the choice of Canton for hosting it due to the lack of facilities for a large number of teams.

The United States won their third consecutive championship in their third appearance, defeating Japan in the final.  The Gold Medal Game international broadcast was carried on Sports Radio America.

History
The 2015 games in Sweden were originally scheduled to be the first ever to consist of a field of 12 national teams in World Championships. The teams were to be divided into four groups for the preliminary round.

Budgetary considerations caused several teams to withdraw from the 2015 Championship. After the move of the tournament to Canton a new schedule containing only 8 teams was announced.

The schedule in Canton originally had five rounds, with teams divided into two brackets of four teams each.  The preliminary rounds consisted of three games for each team against each of the other teams in their bracket.  The top three finishers in the higher bracket- which included the higher seeded teams (USA, Canada, Japan, and Mexico), and the lone top finisher in the lower bracket would reach the semi-final and final single-elimination round.

In late April #2 seed Canada (silver-medal winners in 2011) announced it would withdraw, citing sponsorship, budgetary and scheduling difficulties.

The revised final schedule included 7 teams playing 4 rounds with three games each day on July 9, 12, 15, 18. #3 seed Japan received a bye in Round 1, while #4 seed Mexico drew a bye in Round 2 as a result of its loss in the first-round game versus the US team.

On July 18, the United States defeated Japan 59–12 to win the 2015 IFAF World Championship.

Qualifying

Teams with an asterisk did not attend.

Notes

This was the fifth IFAF World Championship tournament for Japanese defensive lineman Yasuo Wakisaka, 46. He is the only player to appear in all world championship tournaments since its inception in 1999.

Venue
All games of the tournament were to be played in the 30,000 spectator Tele2 Arena located in Stockholm, Sweden but were moved to Tom Benson Hall of Fame Stadium in Canton, U.S. instead.

Bracket

Group A
In the revised schedule, best 3 teams of Group A would advance to 1st-4th playoffs, while the bottom team would be relegated to 5th-8th playoffs. Since Canada (originally seed #2) withdrew from the tournament after the revised schedule was announced, their spot was left vacated, giving byes to Japan for Round 1, the loser between United States and Mexico for Round 2, and the Group B 4th place for 5th-8th playoffs semifinal.

Group B
1st place of Group B would be promoted to 1st-4th playoffs, while the rest would advance to 5th-8th playoffs.

Consolation Round

Championship Round

All times in Eastern Daylight Time (UTC−04:00)

Matches

Round 1
Game 1

South Korea took an early lead, as Bong Do Yeo returned an interception 36 yards for a touchdown early in the first quarter, which put South Korea on top 6–0. Australia's Jared Stegman was picked off again later in the quarter by Jun Keun Hwang, but South Korea was unable to take advantage of the turnover. Australia responded with 47 unanswered points, including a safety in the third quarter, to win 47–6. Stegman threw for 133 yards and four touchdowns and Conor Foley ran for 132 yards and a TD. Australia's offense finished with 385 total yards, including 247 yards rushing. The defense also held South Korea to just 69 total yards, including minus-21 yards rushing. Australia snapped a four-game losing streak in the IFAF World Championship tournament dating back to 1999. Right tackle Jason Aslimoski (39 years old) is the only player on Australia's roster remaining from the 1999 team.

Game 2

France scored 13 seconds into the game, with a 102-yard kickoff return for a touchdown by Anthony Dable, and it was all France from there. Quarterback Paul Durand connected with Guillaume Rioux for two touchdowns to put France up 21–0 by the end of the first quarter. Durand was 11-of-19 passing for 136 yards with no interceptions, while Rioux hauled in four passes for 58 yards. Brazil scored their first ever IFAF tournament points when Rhudson Fonsecsa scored on a run from 2 yards out. Brazil tried for two, but was unsuccessful. France finished off the scoring with a 53-yard touchdown run by Stephan Yepmo with under a minute left. The run gave Yepmo 109 yards on 13 carries for the day.

Game 3

The U.S. dominated defensively from the beginning, holding Mexico to minus-6 yards on the ground and 93 through the air. The U.S. earned the win in large part thanks to two former Mount Union players: quarterback Kevin Burke and Luc Meacham. The two connected on a 12-yard touchdown pass to cap a 17-play drive and give the U.S. a 10–0 lead in the second quarter. Mexico answered with a field goal before halftime. In the third quarter, Team USA scored on two of its first three possessions to take total command of the game. Former Texas Tech running back Sadale Foster scored on a five-yard run and Aaron Wimberly, a running back from Iowa State, added a one-yard touchdown run. Burke was the game MVP, completing 18-of-25 passes for a touchdown and two interceptions before backup Dylan Favre (nephew of Brett Favre) saw some playing time in the second half. Meacham grabbed four passes for 37 yards and the touchdown. Mexico finished with just 87 yards of total offense, with Mexico quarterback Isaias Vega completing 11-of-19 passes for 46 yards.

Round 2
Game 4

Brazil figured out how to win at the IFAF World Championship level in just its second game. Brazil dominated from whistle to whistle. Running back Bruno Santucci led all rushers with 108 yards on 8 carries and Romulo Ramus joined him with a 93-yard performance on 10 carries. Quarterback Rodrigo Dantas was 8–18 for 84 yards and two touchdowns, while Rhudson Fonseca had a touchdown and 45 yards passing. Rodrigo Pons (5 catches, 60 yards, 2 touchdowns) and Azevedo (3 catches, 38 yards, 1 touchdown) caused all sorts of problems as well. The play that swung things came after Brazil's only turnover. Down 18–0 midway through the third quarter, South Korea had the ball on Brazil's 38 and was looking to cut into the lead. But Macros da Rocha jumped in front the pass of South Korea's Hoon Kim and returned it to the South Korea 19. Pons then scored the second of his two touchdowns. Due to Canada's withdrawal, South Korea advanced to the fifth place match and Brazil advanced to a match against Australia where the winner of that game would face South Korea in the fifth place match.

Game 5

France equaled its best start in the International Federation of American Football World Championship with another rout, defeating Australia 53–3. France scored early, when Paul Durand connected with Kevin Mwamba for 4 yard touchdown pass. Yepmo had big game, scoring on two touchdown runs in the second quarter, including a 42-yard run that put France up 17–0. Yepmo finished with 13 carries for 111 yards. For the second game in a row, Anthoney Dable returned a kickoff return for a touchdown, a 92 yards run that increased the France lead to 24–3.  Khandar's 88 yard run in the fourth quarter set an IFAF tournament record for longest touchdown run in a game. Perez Mattison finished out the scoring with a 6-yard pass to Rémi Bertellin.

Game 6

It was a rematch of the 2007 Championship, and in the beginning, it was just as low scoring. The United States was its own worst enemy in the first half as quarterbacks Kevin Burke and Favre each threw an interception. To compound the situation, Japan blocked a 29-yard field goal by Ed Ruhnke when Keizaburo Isagawa snuck through the line. The U.S. broke things open in the second half. U.S. National Team running back Sadale Foster scored 2 touchdowns on the day, one of which was for 60 yards, a new Team USA record. Foster was awarded game MVP, finishing with 12 carries for 84 yards. By the time it was over, the United States reeled off 580 yards of total offense. Favre was 15-of-19 for 193 yards, while Burke was 8-of-16 for 160 yards with a touchdown. That was enough to offset Japan team MVP Shohei Kato, who was 28-of-49 passing for 273 yards with a touchdown for Japan.

Round 3
Game 7

Australia got on top early, ultimately gaining a lead it never gave up as a 58-yard touchdown pass from Jared Stegman (11-of-16, 140 yards, touchdown) to Matt Riles opened the scoring. Fullback Nate Lansdel went in from 4 yards out two drives later and put Brazil down 16 after the first quarter. Australia had outgained Brazil in total offense 134–8. Despite the start, Brazil did come back and closed within a score when Felipe Leiria caught a 10-yard touchdown pass from Rodrigo Dantas (11-of-21, 126 yards) and Breno Tkashashi converted the two-point conversion with 3:06 remaining. Brazil was able to get the ball back after a three-and-out by Australia, but an interception by Damien Donaldson with 58 seconds doomed any hopes of a Brazil comeback. One bright spot for Brazil was the performance by Ramos, who caught 7 passes for 101 yards.

Game 8

Japan had Mexico reeling immediately as Tetsuo Takata connected with Takashi Kurihara for 70 yards just 79 seconds into the game. The two hooked up again later in the quarter on a 10-yard score. Naoki Maeda found the end zone on a 17-yard pass from Takata, and Japan walked into halftime up three scores. The offensive fireworks continued, and by the time it was over, Japan put up some impressive numbers. Takata was 17-of-24 for 223 yards with three touchdowns, while Kurihara registered four catches for 87 yards and the two scores. The running game averaged 6.4 yards per touch, while Taku Lee (7 carries, 31 yards) and Ryo Takagi (9 carries, 26 yards) each registered touchdowns. On the flip side, Japan's defense was on point as defensive linemen Ryota Takahashi (5 tackles, sack) and Tori Hirasawa (4½, sack, two tackles for loss) disrupted the offensive flow for Mexico. The Japanese defense forced Roberto Vega (11-of-21, 136 yards, touchdown) into four interceptions. Japan has been to the International Federation of American Football World Championship finals three times prior, twice winning the gold medal. With its convincing win over Mexico, Japan once again will return to the gold-medal game to take on Team USA. Japan is 11–3 in IFAFWC tournament history, but has never beat the U.S.

Game 9

Playing in its own country for the first time in men's International Federation of American Football World Championship history, and in the city of the birthplace of professional football, the Americans wanted to show they can still reign over the game they created. That point was driven home when the United States beat France, 82–0, setting a new Team USA record for points scored in an IFAF game. None of the U.S. games have been close in Canton, as the U.S. has beaten Japan, Mexico and France by a combined 155–24 (30–6 against Mexico and 43–18 over Japan). Team USA MVP and U.S. running back Aaron Wimberly, broke a U.S. record for most rushing yards in a game, with 117 yards rushing and a touchdown. Unlike its first two games, the United States (3–0) came out strong against the French and put things away relatively early. Wimberly opened the scoring with a 17-yard touchdown run. B.J. Beatty then recovered a blocked punt by Robert Virgil, and it was 12–0 early. By the time the quarter was over, Trent Steelman added a 49-yard touchdown catch from Kevin Burke, and Matt Oh not only sacked Perez Mattison but recovered the fumble for a score to make it a 26-point lead. The United States was up 54–0 at halftime. The U.S. dominated on offense, with 334 yards rushing and 454 total yards. The defense was just as impressive, causing 4 turnovers and holding France's offense to minus-26 yards rushing, and 75 yards of total offense.

5th Place Game

There was no medal on the line Saturday when Australia beat South Korea, 42–14, to clinch fifth place at the International Federation of American Football World Championship. The Australians started the scoring in the first quarter going up 7–0. Another Aussie drive put the team in scoring range late in the first quarter. On 3rd down and goal from the 6 yard line, Conor Foley seemed to be tackled by two defenders at the 10 yard line. Foley broke through those two tackles, and spun away from yet another defender to give Australia a 14-point lead. The Australia defense then showed that they can score points as well, as Damien Donaldson intercepted a pass on the Aussie 35 yard line, returned it five yards before lateraling to Calvin Young, who then raced 60 more yards to pay dirt to give the squad a 20–0 lead late in the second quarter. Australian quarterback Jared Stegman had another good game, going 18-of-27 for 224 yards and a touchdown, and he tied a tournament record by throwing six touchdown passes. Daniel Strickland led the receivers, with 88 yards on five catches (including a touchdown), and Tyson Garnham hauled in nine passes for 70 yards. Nate Lansdel added a score and 39 yards rushing, and the Australian offense recorded three touchdowns on the ground. South Korea goes home winless, but the team did make history when San Hong Kim scored the country's first offensive touchdown in IFAFWC history and backed it up when Bo Sung Park ran one in as well. While the Aussies got the win, the South Koreans had better rushing and receiving performers. Sung Park ran for 69 yards on 16 carries, while Hong Kim caught 4 passes for 140 yards.

Bronze Medal Game

In the Bronze Medal Game of the International Federation of American Football World Championship, Mexico defeated France 20–7. It was the first win of the IFAF 2015 tournament for Mexico, which was surprising considering the fact that Mexico was facing its worse performance in IFAFWC history following runner-up finishes in 1999 and 2003 and a fourth-place finish in 2011. The loss for France was just as surprising, as the French team lost two in a row after easily winning their first two games. But perhaps the biggest loss of all for France was the loss of starting quarterback Paul Durand, who could not start due to an injury he suffered in the previous game against the U.S. Durand did make one attempt at passing, but pain sidelined him after that play. Without Durand at quarterback, France had to rely on the oldest quarterback in the tournament, 41-year-old Perez Mattison. The France offense just wasn't the same. Mexico's defense forced three interceptions (by Cesar Martinez, Jaime Heras and Vladislave Avila), and the Mexican offense had their best game of the tournament. Early on, it looked like Mexico was going to run away with things after Alexis Magallanes scored from 55 yards on the second play of the first quarter. Jose Maltas added a 40-yard field goal, and Mexico was up 9–0 until late in the second quarter. But a 12-yard touchdown by Stephan Yepmo (17 carries, 78 yards) capped off a seven-play, 68-yard drive before halftime, and just like that the French went into halftime down by only two. The French drove inside Mexico territory to start the half, but a fumble by Mattison gave it back to Mexico. Maltas put a 53-yard field goal through the uprights to give Mexico a 12–7 lead, and France never got any closer. Mexico running back and team MVP Allan Rosado rushed for 115 yards and a touchdown. Despite the loss, France leaves matching its highest finish in IFAF history. Mattison finished the day 17 of 31 for 160 yards.

Gold Medal Game

Japan had won two World Championships, and the United States had won two World Championships. When these two teams faced off in the Gold Medal Game, something had to give. By the time it was over, Team USA had its third straight title game of the International Federation of American Football World Championship, with a crushing 59–12 win over Japan. Playing in just its fourth game as a team, the United States looked like a veteran squad that had been together for years as each member won a gold medal for the first time. It came in just about every facet as defense was responsible for three touchdowns – a 75-yard pick six by David Guthrie, a 36-yard fumble recovery by Kyle Olugbode, and another fumble recovery by Alex Gross in the end zone. It came with touchdowns from eight players, and it came with 413 yards on 62 plays for an average of 6.7 yards. Offense once again was at a premium as U.S. game and tournament MVP wide receiver Trent Steelman led all rushers with 56 yards and a score, while Dylan Favre, Aaron Wimberly, and Kevin Burke added rushing scores. Tight end Ernst Brun registered the only receiving touchdown as the United States once again showed its dominance. The defense was stout again, limiting the Japanese rushing game to minus-7 yards. The one minor bright spot for Japan was in the passing game, where Kato (12-22-141 yards) performed very well. Dylan Favre for the US however had a near perfect game (12-12-124). The 2015 Team USA was the most dominant in terms of points (214) and kept the Americans undefeated in IFAF play through 11 games. The 11 games won matches Japan's for most wins by a country, though Japan has lost four times – three of them to the United States. Steelman logged 18 catches for 258 yards and two scores, rushed for 66 yards and a score, and recovered a fumble for a touchdown over four games to earn his All-Tournament MVP nod. Also making the All-Tournament team were: Burke, Wimberly, Brun, and James Atoe on offense, and Jack Sherlock, Steve Kurfehs, Gross, Guthrie, and Robert Virgil on defense. The 3,000 fans at the game was not only the largest crowd in the tournament, but also the first game in the tournament to have more than 1,000 in attendance, yet a far cry from the previous high of 20,000 set in Austria in 2011.

References

External links
 

2015 in American football
IFAF World Championship
American football controversies
IFAF World Championship